The enzyme dolichyl-phosphatase (EC 3.1.3.51) catalyzes the reaction

dolichyl phosphate + H2O  dolichol + phosphate

This enzyme belongs to the family of hydrolases, to be specific, those acting on phosphoric monoester bonds.  The systematic name is dolichyl-phosphate phosphohydrolase. Other names in common use include dolichol phosphate phosphatase, dolichol phosphatase, dolichol monophosphatase, dolichyl monophosphate phosphatase, dolichyl phosphate phosphatase, polyisoprenyl phosphate phosphatase, polyprenylphosphate phosphatase, and Dol-P phosphatase.  This enzyme participates in N-linked-glycan biosynthesis.

References

 
 
 

EC 3.1.3
Enzymes of unknown structure